WPCR may refer to:

WPCR-FM – a student-operated college radio station for Plymouth State University
WPCR – acronym for We're Port Clinton Radio at PortClintonRadio.com - an internet-only radio station.